The Laurence-Jackson company of Wolverhampton built a light car in 1920, powered by an 8/10 hp J.A.P. v-twin engine, and featuring friction transmission and chain drive. The only body style offered was an open 2-seater. The car was originally priced at £200, but this rose to £295.

The worldwide distributor was Car Concessionnaires Limited, 72 Regent Street, London, and the London office was at 58 New Compton Street.

References

Defunct motor vehicle manufacturers of England
Defunct companies based in the West Midlands (county)